Cheryomnoye is a rural locality (a selo) and the administrative center of Cheryomnovsky Selsoviet, Pavlovsky District, Altai Krai, Russia. The population was 4,624 as of 2013. There are 31 streets.

Geography 
Cheryomnoye is located 36 km southeast of Pavlovsk (the district's administrative centre) by road. Sarai is the nearest rural locality.

References 

Rural localities in Pavlovsky District, Altai Krai